Francis Joseph Gossman (April 1, 1930 – August 12, 2013) was an American prelate of the Roman Catholic Church. He served as bishop of the Diocese of Raleigh in North Carolina from 1975 to 2006.

Biography

Early life 
Francis Gossman was born on April 1, 1930, in Baltimore, Maryland, to Frank and Genevieve (née Steadman) Gossman. He attended St. Charles College in Ellicott City, Maryland.  He then entered St. Mary's Seminary in Baltimore, where he obtained a Bachelor's degree in 1952. Gossman then furthered his studies at the Pontifical North American College in Rome.

Priesthood
In Rome, Gossman was ordained a priest for the Archdiocese of Baltimore by Archbishop Martin  O’Connor on December 17, 1955. He earned a Licentiate of Sacred Theology from the Pontifical Gregorian University in 1956. Upon his return to the United States, Gossman began his graduate studies at the Catholic University of America School of Canon Law in Washington, D.C., receiving a Doctor of Canon Law degree in June 1959.

Gossman then served as vice-chancellor for the Archdiocese of Baltimore and assistant pastor at the Basilica of the Assumption in Baltimore.  In 1968, he was named administrator of the Cathedral of Mary Our Queen in Baltimore. Gossman was raised by the Vatican to the rank of monsignor on June 27, 1965.

Auxiliary Bishop of Baltimore
On July 15, 1968, Gossman was appointed auxiliary bishop of the Archdiocese of Baltimore and titular bishop of Aguntum by Pope Paul VI. He received his episcopal consecration on September 11, 1968, from Cardinal Lawrence Sheehan, with Bishops Thomas Murphy and Thomas Mardaga serving as co-consecrators. As an auxiliary bishop, he served as vicar for inner city Baltimore.

Bishop of Raleigh
Gossman was named the fourth bishop of the Diocese of Raleigh on April 8, 1975. After a 31-year-long tenure and reaching the mandatory retirement age of 75, his resignation was accepted by Pope Benedict XVI on June 8, 2006.

Francis Gossman died in Raleigh from a long-term illness on August 12, 2013 at age 83.

See also

 Catholic Church hierarchy
 Catholic Church in the United States
 Historical list of the Catholic bishops of the United States
 List of Catholic bishops of the United States
 Lists of patriarchs, archbishops, and bishops

Notes

External links
Roman Catholic Archdiocese of Baltimore website
Roman Catholic Diocese of Raleigh, North Carolina

1930 births
2013 deaths
St. Charles College alumni
St. Mary's Seminary and University alumni
Religious leaders from Baltimore
Roman Catholic Diocese of Raleigh
Catholic University of America alumni
Roman Catholic bishops in North Carolina
Catholic University of America School of Canon Law alumni
20th-century Roman Catholic bishops in the United States
21st-century Roman Catholic bishops in the United States